Wang Ercheng (born October 1955) is a Chinese politician. He an alternate member of the 19th Central Committee of the Chinese Communist Party. He was a member of the Standing Committee of the 12th National People's Congress. He was a member of the 13th National Committee of the Chinese People's Political Consultative Conference.

Biography
Wang was born in Dandong, Liaoning, in October 1955. During the Cultural Revolution, he worked in Xizhimen Business Office of Beijing Timber Company between December 1971 and May 1981. 

He joined the Chinese Communist Party in December 1980. In May 1981, he became an official in Beijing Municipal Materials Bureau, and rose to deputy sector chief one year later. In August 1985, he was assigned to the Organization Department of the CCP Central Committee, where he was promoted to director of its General Office in March 2000 and to vice minister in July 2007. He was appointed party branch secretary of the National Council for Social Security Fund in July 2015, concurrently serving as party member of the Ministry of Finance since March 2018.

In November 2020, he was made vice chairperson of the Social and Legal Affairs Committee of the National Committee of the Chinese People's Political Consultative Conference.

References

1955 births
Living people
People from Dandong
Beijing Normal University alumni
China Europe International Business School alumni
People's Republic of China politicians from Liaoning
Chinese Communist Party politicians from Liaoning
Members of the Standing Committee of the 12th National People's Congress
Members of the 13th Chinese People's Political Consultative Conference
Alternate members of the 19th Central Committee of the Chinese Communist Party